Duncan Alan Jupp (born 25 January 1975) is a former professional footballer who played as a defender. Born in England, he earned nine caps with the Scotland U21 national team.

Career
Jupp began his career as a trainee with Fulham where he made more than 100 appearances before he moved to Wimbledon for £200,000. He later had spells with Notts County and Luton Town before joining Southend United, where he helped the club to two consecutive promotions - including scoring the decisive goal in the Football League Two Playoff final in 2005 against Lincoln City; his only goal for the club.

He signed for Gillingham on 22 May 2006 and made his debut in the 2–1 home win over Huddersfield Town on 5 August. He left the club by mutual consent on 17 December 2007. He joined Bognor Regis Town in January 2008.

Jupp, who also worked as a football coach at Dorset House School in nearby Pulborough, announced his retirement from football in July 2009. However, in September 2010, he made a comeback and returned to Bognor.

Honours
Individual
PFA Team of the Year: 1994–95 Third Division, 1995–96 Third Division

References

External links 

1975 births
Living people
English people of Scottish descent
Scottish footballers
Association football defenders
Scotland under-21 international footballers
Premier League players
English Football League players
Southend United F.C. players
Luton Town F.C. players
Notts County F.C. players
Fulham F.C. players
Wimbledon F.C. players
Gillingham F.C. players